The Zacapa salamander (Bolitoglossa zacapensis) is a species of salamander in the family Plethodontidae.
It is endemic to Guatemala.

References
 Rovito, Vásquez-Almazán & Papenfuss, 2010 : A new species of Bolitoglossa from the Sierra de las Minas, Guatemala. Journal of Herpetology, p. 44, n. 4, p. 516-525.
 Rovito, S.M, 2011: Bolitoglossa zacapensis. Information on amphibian biology and conservation. [web application]. Berkeley, California: Bolitoglossa zacapensis. AmphibiaWeb. Downloaded on 16 October 2012.

Bolitoglossa
Endemic fauna of Guatemala
Amphibians described in 2010